The 1988 Big East baseball tournament was held at Muzzy Field in Bristol, Connecticut. As a result, St. John's earned the Big East Conference's automatic bid to the 1988 NCAA Division I baseball tournament. This was the Redmen's third tournament championship in the first four.

Format and seeding 
The 1988 Big East baseball tournament was a 4 team double elimination tournament. The top two teams from each division, based on conference winning percentage only, earned berths in the tournament. Each division winner played the opposite division's runner up in the first round.

Tournament

All-Tournament Team 
The following players were named to the All-Tournament team.

Jack Kaiser Award 
Mike Weinberg was the winner of the 1988 Jack Kaiser Award. Weinberg was an outfielder for St. John's.

References 

Tournament
Big East Conference Baseball Tournament
Big East Conference baseball tournament
Big East Conference baseball tournament
College baseball tournaments in Connecticut
Bristol, Connecticut
Sports competitions in Hartford County, Connecticut